Fool Moon (original title: La Forêt de Quinconces) is a 2016 French romantic drama film written and directed by Grégoire Leprince-Ringuet and produced by Paulo Branco. It was selected to screen in the Special Screenings section of the 2016 Cannes Film Festival.

Cast 
 Grégoire Leprince-Ringuet as Paul
 Pauline Caupenne as Camille
 Amandine Truffy as Ondine
 Marilyne Canto as Ève
 Antoine Chappey as Bruno
 Thierry Hancisse as the clochard
 Héloïse Godet as Ondine's friend

References

External links 
 
 

2016 films
2016 romantic drama films
2010s French-language films
French romantic drama films
Films directed by Grégoire Leprince-Ringuet
Films produced by Paulo Branco
2016 directorial debut films
2010s French films